There is a number of flag flying days in Norway.

Dates when the Norwegian state flag is flown by all branches of government and state agencies are listed in Article 4 of the regulations concerning the use of the state flag and the merchant flag, as modified by Royal Resolution of 3 December 2004. Civilians are also encouraged to display the national flag on these flag flying days. The flag is flown on the birthday of a member of the Norwegian Royal House, on some Christian holidays and on the dates of significant events of Norwegian history.

On the Day of the Sami people both state institutions and civilians are encouraged but not required to fly the Sami flag in addition to the Norwegian flag.

Full staff 
The Norwegian flag is flown at full staff on the following days:

Half staff 
On days designated as official days of mourning the state flag is to be flown at half staff by state and government agencies. There are no permanent days of mourning and this provision only comes into use upon the death of a member of the Royal House or as designated by the Government. Upon the death of a member of the Royal House the flag is to be displayed at half staff each day from the announcement of death until the end of the burial. If the burial service of a non-royal person connected to an individual public institution occurs on a flag flying day the flag flown by that institution is lowered to half staff until the burial service is over.

Former flag days 
The flag is flown for living members of the Royal House. When a royal dies or leaves the Royal House, their birthday is no longer a flag flying day. The Royal House is defined to only consist of the Monarch, those directly in line of succession and their spouses. The three living princesses have left the Royal House in connection with their marriages.

References

General

Specific

External links
 

Flags of Norway
 
Norway